The Tyneside Songster (or to give it its full title – "The Tyneside Songster containing a splendid collection of Local Songs by popular Authors, in the Northumbrian Dialect Printed by J W Swanston, 67 & 69 St Andrews Street, Newcastle and may be had at all Booksellers, Newsagents, &c"  is a chapbook of Geordie folk song consisting of 39 songs, crammed into its meagre 16 pages, and published in the 1880s by J. W. Swanston, a Newcastle printer and publisher.

The publication 
The contents include a general collection of, either at that time or sometime earlier, well known and popular, local songs written by a collection of songwriters. A set of the original documents is retained by the Tyne & Wear Archives and Museum Service. This is the record office for the cities and districts of Newcastle, Gateshead, Sunderland, South Tyneside and North Tyneside.

The front cover of the book was as thus :- 
THE
Tyneside
SONGSTER
CONTAINING
A splendid collection of Local Songs by
popular Authors, in the Northumbrian
Dialect
– - – - – - – - – - – -

– - – - – - – - – - – -
NEWCASTLE
Printed by J W SWANSTON, 67 & 69 St Andrews Street
and may be had at all Booksellers, Newsagents, &c
– - – - – - – - – - – -
One, two, or three copies of this Song Book may be had direct from the
Printer, for the published price, with an additional halfpenny for postage, 
and will be sent to any address in the United Kingdom. Larger numbers
at the same rate.

On the top right, above the title, is printed the price, “One Penny”

Contents 
are as below :-<br/ >

Notes
Due to the only copy of the book available being damaged, it was not able to ascertain the page numbers of many of the songs. Therefore, the second section the above, list those songs in alphabetic order.
Can anyone help with the numbering of these pages?

See also 
Geordie dialect words
J. W. Swanston

References

External links
 FARNE archive – click “Tyneside songster” and “go”

English folk songs
Songs related to Newcastle upon Tyne
Northumbrian folklore
1880s books
Chapbooks